Alirio Rodríguez (April 4, 1934 - May 2, 2018) was a Venezuelan painter and visual artist. He was born in El Callao, Venezuela, and died in Caracas, Venezuela. His art was widely acclaimed in his native Venezuela and abroad, winning him multiple awards and recognitions as one of the top Venezuelan plastic artists of the 20th century.

Early life 

Born in El Callao, State of Bolivar, Venezuela in 1934, Alirio Rodríguez was the son of Arturo Rodríguez Lozada, and Teodora Borges Santi. His infancy is spent in El Callao and his love for the plastic arts starts in elementary school where he drew his first drawings.

In 1947 Rodriguez moves to Caracas and enrolls in the "Escuela de Artes Plasticas," where he has Marcos Castillo, Rafael Ramón González, Rafael Monasterios, César Prieto, Luis Alfredo López Méndez and Francisco Narváez, among others, as teachers. In 1958, and until 1961, Alirio Rodriguez receives an scholarship of the Venezuelan Ministry of Education to travel to Italy where he studies at the Instituto D'Arte di Roma.

Career 

Upon his return to Caracas in 1961, Alirio Rodríguez adopted his characteristic humanistic-figurative style, and participates in individual and collective shows both in Venezuela and abroad to wide acclaim, including numerous expositions in Caracas, Rome, Washington DC, Bogotá, Paris, New York and many others, such as the Biennial of Quito, Biennial of Paris, Biennial of Venice, Musée Modern Museum of Belgium, Museo de Bellas Artes de Lima, Oklahoma Museum of Art, Metropolitan Museum of Manila, Museo Nacional de Medellín, Grand Palais in Paris, Museo de Bellas Artes de Caracas, Museo de Arte Contemporáneo de Caracas, Indianapolis Museum of Art, and others.

From 1961 to 1982 Rodríguez chairs the Catedra de Dibujo y Pintura (Drawing and Painting Department) at the Escuela de Artes Plásticas 'Cristóbal Rojas' ('Cristóbal Rojas' Plastic Arts School) in Caracas. Additionally, from 1974 to 1976, he works as associated professor at the Instituto Pedagógico de Caracas.

Rodríguez’s work represented Venezuela at the XXXVII Venice International Art Biennial. His work is part of the collections of the Museo de Arte Contemporáneo de Caracas, Museo de Bellas Artes de Caracas, Galería de Arte Nacional in Caracas, Museo Alejandro Otero, Fundación Celarg, the Jack S. Blanton Museum of Art at the University of Texas at Austin, and others.

Awards 
The following is a partial list of awards and prizes earned by Rodríguez:

1957 • Second Prize, Ateneo de Valera y Trujillo, Trujillo State, Venezuela
1961 • Drawing Award, Casa de la Cultura de Aragua, Maracay, Venezuela
1962 • Arturo Michelena Award, XX Salón Arturo Michelena, Venezuela
1963 • Emilio Boggio Award, XXI Salón Arturo Michelena / Drawing Award, Ateneo de Caracas
1965 • First Prize for Drawing, “Exposición nacional de dibujo y grabado”, Facultad de Arquitectura, UCV, Venezuela / Award Venezuelan Association of Architects, XXVI Salón Oficial
1966 • Award Federico Brandt and Award Marcos Castillo, XXVII Salón Oficial / Premio OCI, OCI, Venezuela
1968 • Acquavella Award, XXIX Salón Oficial, Venezuela
1969 • National Painting Award, XXX Salón Oficial, Venezuela
1972 • First Prize Honorary Mention for Foreign Painters, Bienal de Quito, Ecuador
1974 • First Prize, “Salón las artes plásticas en Venezuela”, MBA
1981 • Award Renaissance for the Arts, Renaissance Circle, París, France
1995 • Alejandro Otero Award, Dirección de Cultura del Estado Bolívar, Ciudad Bolívar / Pedro Ángel González Fine Arts Medal, Fundación Pedro Ángel González, Caracas, Venezuela

Death 

Alirio Rodríguez died on May 2, 2018, in Caracas after a month of hospitalization as a consequence of pneumonia.

References

External links

Venezuelan artists
1934 births
2018 deaths
Figurative Abstraction